Argentina competed at the 2016 Summer Olympics in Rio de Janeiro, Brazil, from 5 to 21 August 2016. This was the nation's twenty-fourth appearance at the Summer Olympic Games, having missed only three editions since their 1900 debut: the 1904 Summer Olympics in St. Louis, the 1912 Summer Olympics in Stockholm and the 1980 Summer Olympics in Moscow because of its support for the United States-led boycott. The Argentine Olympic Committee sent the nation's largest ever delegation to the Games in Olympic history, surpassing the record set in London 1948.

On 6 August, judoka Paula Pareto claimed the gold in the women's 48 kg, becoming the first Argentine woman to become an Olympic champion.

Medalists

The following Argentine competitors won medals at the games. In the by discipline sections below, medalists' names are bolded.

Competitors

| width=78% align=left valign=top |
The following is the list of number of competitors participating in the Games. Note that reserves in fencing, field hockey, football, and handball are not counted as athletes:

Athletics

Argentine athletes have so far achieved qualifying standards in the following athletics events (up to a maximum of 3 athletes in each event):

Track & road events
Men

Women

Field events

Basketball

Men's tournament

Argentina's men's basketball team qualified for the Olympics by attaining a top two finish towards the final match of the 2015 FIBA Americas Championship in Mexico City.

Team roster

Group play

Quarterfinal

Boxing

Argentina has entered five boxers to compete in each of the following weight classes into the Olympic boxing tournament. Fernando Martínez, Ignacio Perrin, Alberto Palmetta, and 2012 Olympians Alberto Melián and Yamil Peralta had claimed their Olympic spots at the 2016 American Qualification Tournament in Buenos Aires. Leandro Blanc rounded out the Argentine roster with his box-off victory at the 2016 APB and WSB Olympic Qualifier in Vargas, Venezuela.

Canoeing

Slalom
Argentina has qualified one boat in the men's slalom C-1 for the Games, as the International Canoe Federation accepted the nation's request to claim a spare berth freed by the United States. The slot was awarded to London 2012 Olympian Sebastián Rossi, who finished fourth at the 2015 Pan American Games in Toronto.

Sprint
Argentine canoeists have qualified one boat in each of the following events through the 2015 ICF Canoe Sprint World Championships.

Men

Women

Qualification Legend: FA = Qualify to final (medal); FB = Qualify to final B (non-medal)

Cycling

Road
Argentine riders qualified for a maximum of three quota places in the men's Olympic road race by virtue of their top 5 national ranking in the 2015 UCI America Tour.

Mountain biking
Argentina has qualified one mountain biker for the men's Olympic cross-country race, as a result of his nation's sixteenth-place finish in the UCI Olympic Ranking List of 25 May 2016.

BMX
Argentine riders qualified for one men's and one women's quota place for BMX at the Olympics, as a result of the nation's eighth-place finish for men in the UCI Olympic Ranking List and top three for women in the UCI BMX Individual Ranking List of 31 May 2016.

Equestrian

Argentina has entered a squad of four riders in the team jumping competition by virtue a top two national finish at the 2015 Pan American Games in Toronto, Canada.

"#" indicates that the score of this rider does not count in the team competition, since only the best three results of a team are counted.

Fencing

Argentina has entered one fencer into the Olympic competition. London 2012 Olympian María Belén Pérez Maurice had claimed the Olympic spot in the women's sabre as one of the two highest-ranked fencers coming from the America zone in the FIE Adjusted Official Rankings.

Field hockey

Summary

Men's tournament

Argentina's men's field hockey team qualified for the Olympics by having achieved a top three finish at the 2014–15 Men's FIH Hockey World League Semifinals.

Team roster

Group play

Quarterfinal

Semifinal

Gold medal match

Women's tournament

Argentina's women's field hockey team qualified for the Olympics by having achieved a top four finish at the 2014–15 Women's FIH Hockey World League Semifinals.

Team roster

Group play

Quarterfinal

Football

Men's tournament

Argentina's men's football team qualified for the Olympics after sealing their triumph at the 2015 South American Youth Championship in Uruguay.

Team roster

Group play

Golf 

Argentina has entered two golfers into the Olympic tournament. Emiliano Grillo (world no. 44) and Fabián Gómez (world no. 73) qualified directly among the top 60 eligible players for the men's event based on the IGF World Rankings as of 11 July 2016.

Gymnastics

Artistic
Argentina has entered two artistic gymnasts into the Olympic competition. Ailen Valente claimed her Olympic spot in the women's apparatus and all-around events at the Olympic Test Event in Rio de Janeiro. Meanwhile, Nicolás Córdoba received a spare Olympic berth freed up by Portugal's Gustavo Simões, who withdrew from the Games due to a severe fracture in his left foot, to compete in the men's events.

Men

Women

Handball

Summary

Men's tournament

Argentina's men's handball team qualified for the Olympics, after securing a spot in the gold medal match and having attained an automatic berth by virtue of Olympic host nation Brazil's win in the other semifinal at the 2015 Pan American Games in Toronto, Canada.

Team roster

Group play

Women's tournament

Argentina's women's handball team qualified for the Olympics, after securing a spot in the gold medal match and having attained an automatic berth by virtue of Olympic host nation Brazil's win in the other semifinal at the 2015 Pan American Games in Toronto, Canada.

Team roster

Group play

Judo

Argentina has qualified two judokas for each of the following weight classes at the Games. Remarkably going to her third Olympics, Beijing 2008 bronze medalist Paula Pareto was ranked among the top 14 eligible judokas for women in the IJF World Ranking List of 30 May 2016, while Emmanuel Lucenti at men's half-middleweight (81 kg) earned a continental quota spot from the Pan American region as the highest-ranked Argentine judoka outside of direct qualifying position.

Modern pentathlon

Argentine athletes have qualified for the following spots to compete in modern pentathlon, signifying the nation's Olympic return to the sport for the first time since 1960. Emmanuel Zapata secured a selection in the men's event after obtaining a top finish for South America and one of the five Olympic slots from the Pan American Games. Meanwhile, Zapata's Ukrainian-born wife and London 2012 Olympian Iryna Khokhlova was ranked among the top 10 modern pentathletes, not yet qualified, in their respective events based on the UIPM World Rankings as of 1 June 2016.

Rowing

Argentina has qualified one boat each in the men's and women's single sculls for the Games at the 2015 Latin American Continental Qualification Regatta in Valparaíso, Chile.

Qualification Legend: FA=Final A (medal); FB=Final B (non-medal); FC=Final C (non-medal); FD=Final D (non-medal); FE=Final E (non-medal); FF=Final F (non-medal); SA/B=Semifinals A/B; SC/D=Semifinals C/D; SE/F=Semifinals E/F; QF=Quarterfinals; R=Repechage

Rugby sevens

Men's tournament

Argentina's men's rugby sevens team qualified for the Olympics after sealing triumph at the 2015 CONSUR Sevens in Santa Fe, Argentina.

Team roster

Group play

Quarterfinal

Classification semifinal (5–8)

Fifth place game

Sailing

Argentine sailors have qualified one boat in each of the following classes through the 2014 ISAF Sailing World Championships, the individual fleet Worlds, and South American qualifying regattas.

The entire Argentine sailing squad for the Olympics was named on 1 April 2016, including London 2012 bronze medal duo Lucas Calabrese and Juan de la Fuente, and three-time medalist Santiago Lange, who eventually joined his sons and skiff crew Yago and Klaus Lange to confirm his sixth Olympic appearance.

Men

Women

Mixed

M = Medal race; EL = Eliminated – did not advance into the medal race

Shooting

Argentine shooters have achieved quota places for the following events by virtue of their best finishes at the 2015 Pan American Games and the 2015 ISSF World Cup series, as long as they obtained a minimum qualifying score (MQS) by 31 March 2016. Five of them had been selected for the Olympic team at the end of the qualifying period, with rifle shooter Amelia Fournel aiming to appear at her third Olympics after a 16-year hiatus.

Qualification Legend: Q = Qualify for the next round; q = Qualify for the bronze medal (shotgun)

Swimming

Argentine swimmers have so far achieved qualifying standards in the following events (up to a maximum of 2 swimmers in each event at the Olympic Qualifying Time (OQT), and potentially 1 at the Olympic Selection Time (OST)):

Synchronized swimming

Argentina has fielded a squad of two synchronized swimmers to compete only in the women's duet by picking up one of four spare berths freed by the continental selection for being the next highest ranking nation at the FINA Olympic test event in Rio de Janeiro.

Tennis

Argentina has entered six tennis players into the Olympic tournament. London 2012 bronze medalist Juan Martín del Potro (world no. 223), Federico Delbonis (world no. 35), Guido Pella (world no. 50), and Juan Mónaco (world no. 94) qualified directly for the men's singles, as four of the top 56 eligible players in the ATP World Rankings as of 6 June 2016.

Having been directly entered to the singles, del Potro and Delbonis also opted to play with their partners Guillermo Durán and Máximo González, respectively, in the men's doubles.

Triathlon

Argentina has qualified two triathletes for the following events at the Olympics. Luciano Taccone and London 2012 Olympian Gonzalo Tellechea were ranked among the top 40 eligible triathletes in the men's event based on the ITU Olympic Qualification List as of 15 May 2016.

Volleyball

Beach
Argentina's women's beach volleyball team qualified directly for the Olympics by virtue of their nation's top 15 placement in the FIVB Olympic Rankings as of 13 June 2016. The place was awarded to London 2012 Olympian Ana Gallay and her rookie partner Georgina Klug.

Indoor

Men's tournament

Argentina's men's volleyball team qualified for the Olympics by virtue of a top finish and gaining an outright berth at the South American Continental Qualifier in Maiquetía, Venezuela.

Team roster

Group play

Quarterfinal

Women's tournament

Argentina's women's volleyball team qualified for the Olympics by virtue of a top finish and gaining an outright berth at the South American Continental Qualifier in Bariloche, Argentina.

Team roster

Group play

Weightlifting

Argentina has received an unused quota place from IWF to send a female weightlifter to the Olympics.

Wrestling

Argentina has qualified one wrestler for the women's freestyle 48 kg into the Olympic competition, as a result of her semifinal triumph at the 2016 Pan American Qualification Tournament.

Women's freestyle

See also
Argentina at the 2015 Pan American Games
Argentina at the 2016 Winter Youth Olympics
Argentina at the 2016 Summer Paralympics

References

External links 

 

Nations at the 2016 Summer Olympics
2016
Olympics